Eucoptocnemis dolli is a species of moth of the family Noctuidae. It is found in Arizona and California.

The wingspan is about 35 mm. Adults are on wing in fall.

References

Noctuinae
Moths of North America